Perrona spirata is a species of sea snail, a marine gastropod mollusk in the family Clavatulidae.

Description
The size of an adult shell varies between 20 mm and 30 mm.
The whorls are constricted around the upper part, with a rather sharp ridge next to the suture, and an obtuse angle below the constriction. The color of the shell is yellowish, mottled and striped with chestnut.

Distribution
This species occurs in the Atlantic Ocean off Angola.

References

 Gofas, S.; Afonso, J.P.; Brandào, M. (Ed.). (S.a.). Conchas e Moluscos de Angola = Coquillages et Mollusques d'Angola. [Shells and molluscs of Angola]. Universidade Agostinho / Elf Aquitaine Angola: Angola. 140 pp.

External links

 

Endemic fauna of Angola
spirata
Gastropods described in 1816